Harold Edward Snell (born May 28, 1946) is a Canadian former professional ice hockey forward who played 104 games in the National Hockey League for the Kansas City Scouts, Pittsburgh Penguins, and Detroit Red Wings between 1973 and 1975. The rest of his career, which lasted from 1965 to 1988, was mainly spent with the Hershey Bears of the American Hockey League, though he spent the last seven seasons playing in Switzerland, serving as a player-coach for part of it before retiring and coaching full-time.

Career statistics

Regular season and playoffs

External links
 

1946 births
Living people
Canadian ice hockey coaches
Canadian ice hockey forwards
Detroit Red Wings players
Hershey Bears players
Ice hockey people from Ottawa
Kansas City Scouts players
Niagara Falls Flyers (1960–1972) players
Oklahoma City Blazers (1965–1977) players
Phoenix Roadrunners (WHL) players
Pittsburgh Penguins players
SC Langenthal players
Virginia Wings players